In differential geometry and mathematical physics (especially string theory), the Polyakov formula expresses the conformal variation of the zeta functional determinant of a Riemannian manifold. The corresponding density is local, and therefore is a Riemannian curvature invariant. In particular, whereas the functional determinant itself is prohibitively difficult to work with in general, its conformal variation can be written down explicitly.

References
 

Conformal geometry
Spectral theory
String theory